The 1921–22 Army Cadets men's ice hockey season was the 19th season of play for the program. The team was coached by Talbot Hunter in his second season.

Season
After a forgettable season the year before, coach Talbot Hunter received a boon when many men showed up to tryouts, swelling the ranks of the team further than it had even been before. Prospects for a good season were in doubt at the start, when warm weather in December forced the team to practice in the basement of a gymnasium. However, winter soon settled over New York and the team was able to open the season with a solid victory over a team made up primarily of former college players. The Cadets continued playing well when they met Colgate, as their experienced defense kept the opposition from scoring.

Army suffered its first loss to an amateur club from Buffalo but immediately got back on to the positive side of the ledger with a string of consistent play against three colleges. The win over Hamilton was particularly interesting since the Continentals were one of the best teams in the country. The team slipped a bit when the calendar changed to February and MAC broke through the Cadets' defense for four goals. After Dartmouth shut out the Cadets for the first time in over two years, Army recovered in the final game to earn a split with Williams.

Army's record, which included four shutout wins, was one of the best the program had ever posted.

James Whetton served as team manager with John Binns and Francis Graling as his assistants.

Roster

Standings

Schedule and results

|-
!colspan=12 style=";" | Regular Season

References

Army Black Knights men's ice hockey seasons
Army
Army
Army
Army